Ross-on-Wye (Welsh: Rhosan ar Wy) is a market town in England, near the border with Wales. It had a population estimated at 10,978 in 2021. It lies in south-eastern Herefordshire, on the River Wye and on the northern edge of the Forest of Dean.

History

The name "Ross" is derived from the Welsh or Celtic for a "promontory". It was renamed "Ross-on-Wye" in 1931 by the General Post Office, due to confusion with other places of the same or similar name (such as Ross in Scotland).

Ross-on-Wye promotes itself as "the birthplace of British tourism". In 1745, the rector, Dr John Egerton, started taking friends on boat trips down the valley from his rectory at Ross. The Wye Valley's attraction was its river scenery, its precipitous landscapes, and its castles and abbeys, which were accessible to seekers of the "picturesque". In 1782, William Gilpin's book Observations on the River Wye was published, the first illustrated tour guide to be published in Britain. Once it had appeared, demand grew so much that by 1808 there were eight boats making regular excursions along the Wye, most of them hired from inns in Ross and Monmouth. By 1850, more than 20 visitors had published their own accounts of the Wye Tour, and the area was established as a tourist destination.

Parish church

The 700-year-old parish church of St Mary's is the town's most prominent landmark. Its tall pointed spire is visible when approaching the town from all directions. The church holds several distinctive tombs, one of which – that of William Rudhall (who died in 1530) – is one of the last great alabaster sculptures from the specialist masons of Nottingham, whose work was prized across medieval Europe. Rudhall was responsible for the repair of the almshouses to the north west of the church, in 1575. Another tomb is of John Kyrle, a prominent figure in 18th-century Ross, whose name has been taken by the town's secondary school. He is also recalled in one of the town's notable inns, The Man Of Ross.

United Reformed, Methodist and Baptist churches
The Methodist Church is Christ Church in Edde Cross Street. The United Reformed Church congregation, part of the Herefordshire Group, is likewise at Christ Church. The former United Reformed Church in Gloucester Road has now been converted into housing.

Ross Baptist Church is in Broad Street. In 1731 the Baptists built Ryeford Chapel at Weston under Penyard, but by 1817 worshippers from Ross had decided to separate. In 2017, the current Baptist church in Ross marked its 200th anniversary. In early 1818, 22 church members bought ground in Broad Street, to build a chapel with a graveyard behind. The first chapel was opened on 6 October 1818. By 1879 it had become dilapidated, however, with a leaking roof and a damp interior, and it was demolished and replaced at a cost of £3,700. Community events raised £537 towards the cost, but the remaining £3,163 was paid by Thomas Blake, a local philanthropist.

Plague Cross

The Plague or Corpse Cross was erected in the churchyard of St Mary's in 1637 as a memorial to 315 townsfolk who died that year of the plague and were buried nearby in a plague pit – at night and without coffins.

By 1896, the Plague Cross had fallen into disrepair and the top was missing. It was later restored. Since 24 September 1997, it has been listed as a Grade II* edifice.

The Prospect
The Prospect was created by John Kyrle, who rented the land from the Marquess of Bath in 1696 and turned it into a garden and walkway. In 2008, heavy rain uncovered Roman remains that were excavated under the site.

The Prospect provides a public garden opposite the church, containing trees dedicated to local people, a VE Day Beacon and a War Memorial. It offers a view of the famous horseshoe bend in the Wye and as far west as the Black Mountains.

Present day

The town is known for locally owned shops, picturesque streets, and a market square with a market hall.

Thursday and Saturday markets are held at the red sandstone Market House building in the town centre. This was built between 1650 and 1654 to replace a probably wooden Booth Hall. The upper storey now houses an arts and crafts centre.

The town's small theatre, The Phoenix, shows films once a month, along with plays and other arts events.

The ruins of Wilton Castle, to the west of the town, have been restored and opened to visitors. The town has a number of sculptures by Walenty Pytel – the left bank of the Wye shows two of these. Despite the common belief that both depict swans, one in fact shows ducks.

Politics and representation
Most local government functions are vested in Herefordshire Council, the unitary authority covering the county. Ross Town Council, with 18 councillors, six each from the Ross North, West and East wards, has the powers of a parish council. The Mayor is Councillor Daniel Lister. Ross Rural was merged into the civil parish on 1 April 2015. Since the May 2019 local elections, the town council has a majority of Liberal Democrats, with two Conservatives and three Independents.

The town is part of the Hereford and South Herefordshire parliamentary constituency, currently represented in the House of Commons by the Conservative MP Jesse Norman.

Transport

The former Ross-on-Wye railway station was at a junction on the Hereford, Ross and Gloucester Railway north of the town. It was the terminus of the Ross and Monmouth Railway, which joined the Hereford, Ross and Gloucester just south of the station. Opened on 1 June 1855, the line was merged into the Great Western Railway on 29 July 1862 and in 1869 converted from broad gauge to standard gauge in a five-day period. A line to Tewkesbury was authorised by Parliament in 1856, but never built.

Under the Beeching Axe, the lines to Ross closed in stages up to 1964. The brick station has been demolished and the site redeveloped into an industrial estate, on which the brick goods and engine sheds still stand.

The nearest railway station today is Ledbury on the Cotswold Line, but Ross has a better connection with Gloucester, including a bus link with the town and a major interchange on the national rail network.

To the east is the end of the M50, sometimes called the Ross Spur or Ross Motorway, which links with the M5.

Climate
Ross-on-Wye experiences a typically British maritime climate, with mild summers and winters. A Met Office weather station provides long-term climate data for the town. Meteorological readings have been taken in Ross since 1858; the Ross-on-Wye weather station holds some national records.

Notable people
References appear on each person's page. In birth order:
John Kyrle (1637–1724), philanthropist known as "the Man of Ross"
James Cowles Prichard (1786–1848), scientist prominent in anthropology and psychiatry
Frederick Gordon (1835–1904), hotelier
William Partridge (1858–1930), soldier prominent in the 1878 Zulu war
Arthur Pugh (1870–1955), President of the Trades Union Congress
William Henry Squire (1871–1963), Royal Academy of Music member, cellist, composer and music professor
Frank Andrews (1886–1944), international rugby union (Wales) and professional rugby league player
Frederick Burrows (1887–1973), Governor of Bengal
Juxon Barton (1891–1980), Governor of Fiji
Noele Gordon (1919–1985), actress
Yvonne Littlewood (born 1927), television producer
Dennis Potter (1935–1994), dramatist
Pete Overend Watts (1947–2017), member of the Mott the Hoople band
Dale Griffin (1948–2016), member of Mott the Hoople
Sarah Potter (born 1961), test cricketer

Twin towns
Ross-on-Wye has three twin towns:

Betzdorf, Germany
Condé-sur-Noireau, France (since 1978)
Namutumba, Uganda

Gallery

See also
Archenfield
John Kyrle High School
Ross Rowing Club
The Chase Hotel, Ross-On-Wye (now closed)

References

External links

Town Council Ross-on-Wye Town Council

Littlebury's Directory, 1876–1877 

 
Market towns in Herefordshire
Towns in Herefordshire
Towns of the Welsh Marches
River Wye
Civil parishes in Herefordshire